Hend Mana Saeed Al Otaiba is an Emirati government official who currently serves as the ambassador of the United Arab Emirates to France.

Education 
Al Otaiba obtained her undergraduate degree in London, where she studied psychology. She later received a master's degree in marketing, management and communications from the Paris Sorbonne Abu Dhabi in 2011 and also holds a master's degree in security studies from the UAE National Defense College. She is also currently a board member of the Anwar Gargash Diplomatic Academy.

Career 
From 2012 and 2017, Al Otaiba was the Director of Strategic Communications at the state-run media organization Abu Dhabi Media. Her first appointment was in the Tourism Development and Investment Company (TDIC), where she worked in communications from 2008 to 2012. During her time at the TDIC she oversaw cultural programmes and also worked with the French on the Louvre Abu Dhabi.

In 2019, she was appointed as the first director of the strategic communications department at the UAE Ministry of Foreign Affairs and International Cooperation. She also served as the Foreign Ministry's spokesperson. She joined the UAE's foreign ministry in April 2017 as an advisor to Sheikh Abdullah bin Zayed Al Nahyan, the Minister of Foreign Affairs and Co-operation of the UAE.

Al Otaiba was appointed as UAE’s ambassador to France in July 2021.

Personal life 
Al Otaiba is married to Sheikh Salem Al Qassimi current ambassador of the UAE to UNESCO and they have two sons. She's a fluent speaker of French. Her father, Mana Al Otaiba, is the former UAE minister of petroleum and mineral resources and her brother, Yousef Al Otaiba, is the current ambassador of the UAE in the United States.

References 

Ambassadors of the United Arab Emirates to France
Living people
Year of birth missing (living people)